The ONA Group (Omnium Nord-Africain, Arabic: مجموعة أونا) was established in 1934 and dissolved in 2010 and succeeded by Societe Nationale d'Investissement. 
ONA was an industrial, financial and services conglomerate, focused on positions of leadership and value creation in business activities contributing to the growth and sustainable development of Morocco, the Maghreb Region and the African Continent.
ONA Group was structured around several activities: Mining, Agribusiness, Distribution, Financial Services, Telecommunication, Renewable Energies, and Growth Drivers, etc.

The group and its successor promote various cultural programs, local and foreign arts and artists through a charitable foundation "Fondation ONA".

In March 2010, ONA announced its merger with Societe Nationale d'Investissement. As a result of the merger, the two companies have been delisted from the Casablanca stock market, and the ONA agri-business branches have been disposed of. This reorganisation has transformed the conglomerate into an investment company that gives larger autonomy to its subsidiaries in the management of their affairs.

History 
The Compagnie Générale de Transport et de Tourisme was created in 1919 by Jean Épinat. In 1928, it became an exclusive agent of General Motors in Morocco until 1945.

In 1934, it was rebranded into Omnium Nord Africain. During the same year, the ONA became a holding as it entered the mining sector.

In 1953, after World War II, all the assets of Jean Épinat became under the control of The Banque de Paris et des Pays-Bas (Paribas). King Hassan II bought Paribas’ shares in ONA and became the main shareholder of the group in 1980.

In 1982, the group started getting involved in various sectors including dairy products, sugar, banks, chemicals and textile. In 1986, ONA acquired shares in Lesieur Afrique and obtained nearly 40% of Banque Commerciale du Maroc (Morocco's Commercial Bank).

In 1988, ONA invested in the first pay-TV in the Arab world with 2M.

In 1990, the group invested in the retail sector by opening its first hypermarket Marjane Bouregreg. In 2005, the group acquired Maroc Connect, the second internet provider in Morocco, which became Wana corporate and later Inwi in 2009.

In 2005, ONA launched Nareva Holding specialised in low carbon energy.

On March 25, 2010, the group announced that it will be going a strategic reorganisation, including its fusion with SNI and their withdrawal from Casablanca Stock Exchange.

On December 31, 2010, the closure of ONA took place and its activities were integrated into Societe Nationale d'Investissement.

Activities by sector (2009) 
The holding diversified its activity sector by engaging in several industries:

Food industry (51.5% of turnover)
 Centrale Laitière: Dairy products (sold to Danone in 2012)
 Fromagerie des Doukkala: Cheese
 Cosumar: Sugar
 Lesieur Cristal: Oils (sold to Sofiprotéol in 2012)
 Bimo: Biscuits (sold to Kraft Foods in 2012)
 Sotherma: Mineral water
 CMB plastique: Plastic packaging
 Sea food products
Distribution (40.5% of turnover)
 Marjane: Retail outlet, shopping centre 
 Acima: Retail outlet, shopping centre
 Sopriam: Car distribution 
 OPTORG: Distribution of industrial goods
Mines (6.1% of turnover)
 Groupe Managem: Mining operator in Morocco and Africa
 Sonasid: Steel industry
Growth drivers and holdings (1.5% of turnover) 
 Inwi: Telecommunication operator
 Nareva: Energy and environment 
 Onapar: Real estate holding 
 Accolade: Call centre
 Archos Conseil:  Information system and management consulting (sold to Capital Consulting on January 18, 2010)
 NetCom: Business systems and Networks 
Financial activities (0.4% of turnover)
 Attijariwafa Bank: First banking and financial group in the Maghreb and Africa
 Agma Lahlou-Tazi: Risk management consulting and insurance brokerage in Morocco

Shareholders (2009)

Previous presidents 
 Fouad Filali (1986 – April 20, 1999)
 Mourad Cherif (1999 – 2002) 
 Bassim Jaï Hokimi (2002 – 2005)
 Saâd Bendidi (February 2005 – April 2008)
 Mouatassim Belghazi (April 11, 2008 – March 15, 2011)

See also
 Wana (Telecommunications) the third main telecommunication company in Morocco, a subsidiary of ONA.
 Mounir Majidi
 Mohammed VI of Morocco

References

 
Defunct companies of Morocco
Conglomerate companies of Morocco
Holding companies of Morocco
Mohammed VI of Morocco
Société Nationale d'Investissement
Telecommunications companies of Morocco
Conglomerate companies established in 1934
Financial services companies established in 1934
Holding companies established in 1934
Conglomerate companies disestablished in 2010
1934 establishments in Morocco
2010 disestablishments in Morocco
Holding companies disestablished in 2010